Olga Ilyichnina Taratuta (21 January 1876 [or possibly 1874 or 1878] – 8 February 1938) was a Ukrainian anarcho-communist. She was the founder of the Ukrainian Anarchist Black Cross.

Early life and activism
Taratuta was born Elka Ruvinskaia in the village of Novodmitrovka, in the Taurida Governorate of the Russian Empire. Her family was Jewish and her father ran a small shop. Taratuta worked as a teacher after completing her studies.

Taratuta was arrested on "political suspicions" in 1895. In 1897 she joined a social democratic group associated with Abram and Iuda Grossman in Ekaterinoslav. Taratuta was a member of the South Russian Union of Workers and the Elizavetgrad committee of the Social-Democratic Party from 1898 and 1901. In 1901 she moved to Germany and then to Switzerland; during this period she worked for the Party organ Iskra ("Spark") and met Georgi Plekhanov and Vladimir Lenin.

In 1903, while in Switzerland, Taratuta became an anarcho-communist. She returned to Odessa in 1904 and joined Neprimirimye ("The Intransigents"), which was made up of anarchists and other followers of Jan Wacław Machajski. Taratuta was arrested in April 1904, but she was freed for lack of evidence several months later. After her release she joined the Odessa Workers Group of Anarcho-Communists. She began to acquire a reputation as one of the foremost anarchists in Russia.

Taratuta was arrested again in October 1905, but she was released during the political amnesty that resulted from that year's Revolution. She joined the militant wing of the South Russian Group of Anarcho-Communists, which used "motiveless terror"—attacks against institutions and representatives of the bourgeoisie, rather than specific individuals. Taratuta was involved in the bomb attack on Odessa's Café Libman in December 1905, for which she was sentenced to 17 years in prison.

Taratuta escaped from prison in December 1906 and fled to Geneva, where she joined Buntar ("The Mutineer") and edited its newspaper, also called Buntar. In late 1907, she returned to Odessa, where she helped plan attentats against General Aleksandr Kaulbars, the commander of the Odessa military region, and against General Tolmachev, governor of Odessa, and an explosion at the Odessa tribunal.

Taratuta was arrested in 1908 in Ekaterinoslav and given a 21-year prison sentence. She was released in March 1917, following the February Revolution. In May 1918, she joined the Political Red Cross, which help imprisoned revolutionaries of all political affiliations.

Although she initially kept her distance from the anarchist movement, the growing persecution of anarchists by the Bolshevik government inspired Taratuta to join Golos Truda ("Voice of Labor") and the Nabat confederation in June 1920. She returned to Ukraine in September 1920, after the Makhnovists signed a truce with the Soviet government. The Makhnovist commanders gave her 5 million roubles; Taratuta went to Kharkiv and used the money to establish the Anarchist Black Cross to provide aid to imprisoned and other persecuted anarchists.

Soviet repression 
In November 1920, Taratuta was arrested during a Soviet sweep of anarchists and Makhnovists in Ukraine. The Soviets shut down the Anarchist Black Cross. Taratuta was transferred to Moscow in January 1921 and to Orlov in April 1921. The following month, she was offered a release on the condition that she publicly denounce her anarchist beliefs. Instead, she joined her fellow anarchist prisoners in an 11-day hunger strike. In March 1922 she was exiled to Veliky Ustyug for two years.

After her release in 1924, Taratuta moved to Kiev. She was arrested in the middle of that year for publishing anarchist propaganda, but she was soon released. Later that year she moved to Moscow. In 1927, she joined the international campaign to support Sacco and Vanzetti. During 1928 and 1929, Taratuta wrote many letters trying to organize an international organization to support anarchists in Soviet prisons. She moved to Odessa in 1929, and she was arrested for trying to organize an anarchist organization among the rail workers. She was sentenced to two years in prison.

Taratuta returned to Moscow after her release. She joined the Society of Political Prisoners and Exiles, which tried without success to obtain pensions for old, impoverished, and sick revolutionaries. She was arrested and sentenced in 1933, but little is known about this arrest.

Taratuta was arrested on 27 November 1937, and accused of anarchist and anti-Soviet activity. She was condemned to death on 8 February 1938, and executed the same day.

Footnotes

References
 
 
 

1870s births
1938 deaths
People from Kherson Oblast
People from Melitopolsky Uyezd
Ukrainian Jews
Anarcho-communists
Executed anarchists
Jewish anarchists
Soviet anarchists
Ukrainian anarchists
Ukrainian revolutionaries
Executed Ukrainian women
Great Purge victims from Ukraine
Jews executed by the Soviet Union